The 2017 Women's Pan American Cup was the fifth edition of the Women's Pan American Cup, the quadrennial international women's field hockey championship of the Americas organised by the Pan American Hockey Federation. It was held between 5 and 13 August 2017 in Lancaster, Pennsylvania, United States, simultaneously with the men's tournament.

The tournament doubled as the qualifier for two major international tournaments: the winner qualified directly to the 2018 World Cup, and the two teams not qualifying through the 2018 South American Games or the 2018 Central American and Caribbean Games qualified for the 2019 Pan American Games to be held in Lima, Peru. Also, the top 6 teams qualified for the next Pan American Cup, while the bottom two need to compete in the Pan American Challenge.

Argentina won the tournament for the fifth consecutive time after defeating Chile 4–1 in the final. As they had already secured an automatic berth at the 2018 Hockey World Cup thanks to a fourth-place finish at the World League Semifinal in Johannesburg, South Africa, their quota was immediately awarded to first reserve team, Italy.

Qualification
The top six nations at the 2013 Pan American Cup qualified directly with the remaining two spots were assigned to the first and second-placed team at the 2015 Pan American Challenge, which was held in Chiclayo, Peru.

Barbados withdrew before the tournament.

Results
All times are Eastern Daylight Time (UTC−04:00)

First round

Pool A

Pool B

Fifth to seventh place classification

Cross-over

Fifth and sixth place

First to fourth place classification

Semi-finals

Third and fourth place

Final

Statistics

Final ranking

Awards

Goalscorers

See also
2017 Men's Pan American Cup

References

External links
Official website

Women's Pan American Cup
field hockey
International women's field hockey competitions hosted by the United States
Pan American Cup
Pan American Cup
Pan American Cup
Sports in Lancaster, Pennsylvania
Pan American Cup
Pan American Cup